List of Roman Catholic bishops of the Roman Catholic Diocese of Łomża (formed in 1925):

External links